David Christopher Jackson (born 9 June 1953) is a former English cricketer.  Jackson was a right-handed batsman.  He was born in Alnwick, Northumberland.

Jackson made his debut for Durham against Northumberland in the 1982 Minor Counties Championship.  He played Minor counties cricket for Durham from 1982 to 1988, making 33 Minor Counties Championship appearances and 7 MCCA Knockout Trophy appearances. He made his List A debut against Lancashire in the 1983 NatWest Trophy.  He made 3 further List A appearances, the last of which came against Kent in the 1985 NatWest Trophy. In his 4 List A matches, he scored 64 runs at an average of 16.00, with a high score of 40.

References

External links
David Jackson at ESPNcricinfo
David Jackson at CricketArchive

1953 births
Living people
People from Alnwick
Cricketers from Northumberland
English cricketers
Durham cricketers